Dammann is a surname. Notable people with the surname include:

Anna Dammann (1912–1993), German actress
Bill Dammann (1872–1948), American baseball pitcher
Dirk Dammann (born 1967), German footballer
Erik Dammann (born 1931), Norwegian author
Gerhard Dammann (1883–1946), German film actor
Hans Dammann (1867–1942), German sculptor
Herman Dammann (1888-1968), American farmer and politician
Paul-Marcel Dammann (1885–1939), French engraver and medalist
Theodore Dammann, American politician